Millie Gertrude Peacock, Lady Peacock (née Holden; 3 August 1870 – 7 February 1948), was the first woman elected to the Parliament of Victoria. She was the wife of Sir Alexander Peacock, a three-time Premier of Victoria. Upon his death in 1933, Lady Peacock won the by-election to replace him in parliament. She served only a single term, retiring at the 1935 state election.

Early life
Millie Gertrude Holden was the second of two daughters born in East Framlingham, Victoria, to Marianne (née Arnold) and John Bryson Holden.

Her parents were born in Ireland. Her father, originally from County Antrim, had arrived in Victoria in 1855, and became a successful land agent and auctioneer in Port Fairy. Her mother died when she was a few months old, and her father remarried Millie's maternal aunt Jane Ellen Arnold. Millie was given eight half-brothers and half-sisters from this union, and Jane was referred to as her mother throughout her life.

Holden attended Methodist Ladies' College, Melbourne. She was first introduced to politician Alexander Peacock in 1899, when her family hosted members of the Australian Natives' Association during a conference. They married on 1 January 1901, when she was 30 and he was 38. After her husband's knighthood the following year she was known as "Lady Peacock".

Lady Peacock was the President of the Creswick Red Cross from 1914–1918, and a member of the Ladies Benevolent Society, Children's Welfare Association, and Royal Victorian Institute for the Blind Auxiliary.

The Peacocks did not have any children. They appear to have stayed close to Millie's family, especially Millie's only full sibling Agnes (Nellie) and her husband, solicitor Charles Jonas Horsfall. When Sir Alexander Peacock died on 7 October 1933, Charles was named an executor of his will.

Parliament

Following Sir Alexander Peacock's death in 1933, Robert Menzies encouraged Lady Peacock to stand in the by-election for her husband's seat of Allandale. She did so reluctantly and, because she was mourning her husband's death, made no speeches. She was elected and sworn in as the first woman member of the Victorian Legislative Assembly on 21 November 1933.

Lady Peacock only gave one speech in parliament, on the third reading of the Factories Act Bill. She spoke on her husband's role in forming the bill.

She retired from politics at the end of her term in 1935, saying that representing a country electorate in parliament was no place for a woman.

Death 
Lady Peacock continued her community work at Creswick. She died in 1948, and is buried next to her husband.

References

External links
Parliament of Victoria. Women in Parliament, Lady Peacock
 "Peacock, Millie Gertrude (1870–1948)" at National Library of Australia
 

1870 births
1948 deaths
United Australia Party members of the Parliament of Victoria
Members of the Victorian Legislative Assembly
Australian people of Northern Ireland descent
People educated at Methodist Ladies' College, Melbourne
People from Port Fairy
Women members of the Victorian Legislative Assembly
Red Cross personnel